

Mathieu Madénian (born 23 July 1976) is a French comedian, actor and columnist.

Life and career 
Madénian was born in Perpignan, southern France. He is of Armenian and German  descent. He grew up in Saleilles, a town in the suburbs of Perpignan, where he earned his scientific baccalaureate with honours, then a university degree in criminology, then became a lawyer. When he was 25 he left the law profession to follow a career in comedy

He landed his first role in Un gars, une fille where he performed various voiceovers alongside Jean Dujardin and his wife Alexandra Lamy. He then wrote several one-man shows staged by Kader Aoun, many of which were performed at the théâtre du Point-Virgule.

From September 2010 has been a part of the French television show Vivement dimanche prochain, presented by Michel Drucker. He does a humor column. alternating with Anne Roumanoff, Nicolas Canteloup or Éric Antoine.

From 2010 to 2011, he was also involved in Le Grand Direct des Médias with Jean-Marc Morandini shown on Europe 1.

Since September 2011, he has been a columnist on Michel Druckers show Faites entrer l'invité on Europe 1.

On 7 January 2015 Madénian did not go to work and escaped the shooting at the offices of the satirical weekly Charlie Hebdo.

Cinema 
 2014 : Les Gazelles directed by Mona Achache
 2016 : Roommates Wanted directed by François Desagnat
 2016 : Marseille directed by Kad Merad

Television 
 2001-2004 : Un gars, une fille with Jean Dujardin and Alexandra Lamy  (Voiceover) 
 2005 : Attention ça tourne  (Chroniqueur et Auteur) 
 2007 : Jamel Comedy Club Season 2 presented by Jamel Debbouze on Canal +  (Actor) 
 2007 : Les Agités du bocal presented by Alexis Trégarot and Stéphane Blakowski on France 4  (Columnist and Author) 
 2008 : Pliés en 4 presented by Cyril Hanouna on France 4  (Columnist and Author) 
 2009 : L'habit ne fait pas Lemoine presented by Jean-Luc Lemoine  (Columnist and Author) 
 2010 : Vivement Dimanche presented by Michel Drucker on France 2  (Columnist and Author) 
 2011 : La Pire Semaine de ma Vie directed by Frédéric Auburtin et released on M6  (Actor) 
 2011 : À la maison pour Noël directed by Christian Merret-Palmair and released soon on France 2  (Actor)

Radio 
 2007 : Made in Blagues on Rire et Chansons
 2009 : Nouveaux Talents on Rire et Chansons
 2010 : Europe 1 Soir of Nicolas Demorand on Europe 1  (Columnist and Author) 
 2010-2011 : Le Grand direct|Le Grand direct des Médias of Jean Marc Morandini on Europe 1  (Columnist and Author) 
 2011 : Faites entrer l'invité of  Michel Drucker on Europe 1

Theatre 
 2004-2005 : Tout va bien se passer at Café Théâtre La Providence
 2006-2008 : L'Amour en Kit at Théâtre des Blancs-Manteaux, then at Théâtre du Temple
 2008 : La Route du Rire  First part of Anne Roumanoff, Titoff, Anthony Kavanagh, Patrick Bosso, Gérald Dahan, Jean-Luc Lemoine... 
 2009 : Stand Up at Café Théâtre Le Panam
 2010-2011 : One Man Show at Théâtre du Point Virgule (Staged by Kader Aoun)
 2011-2012 : One Man Show at Théâtre Trévise (Staged by Kader Aoun)

Notes and references

External links 
 
 

1976 births
Living people
People from Perpignan
French male stage actors
French male film actors
French male television actors
French people of Armenian descent
French people of German descent